David Stephen Mehew (born 29 October 1967) is an English former professional footballer who played in the Football League for Bristol Rovers, Exeter City and Walsall. He previously managed Gloucester City and Mangotsfield United.

Playing career 
He began his career at Leeds United, before moving to Bristol Rovers. He had a loan spell at Exeter City and later moved on to Walsall and Northampton Town before dropping down to non-league football.

In 1999, he represented Forest Green Rovers in the FA Trophy final at Wembley.

Managerial career 
Mehew  worked as manager at Gloucester City between 2008 and 2014 having previously been assistant boss to Tim Harris at the club. He led them to promotion through the Southern Football League play-offs in May 2009 and took them into the first round proper of the FA Cup for the first time in 20 years where they lost to Football League One side Leyton Orient on 14 November 2012. On 22 February 2014, his time with the club came to an end after he was sacked following a league game with North Ferriby United.

In April 2014, he rejected a job offer to become manager at Cinderford Town. In July 2014, he was appointed as assistant manager at Mangotsfield United. However, in October 2015 it was announced that he had left his role at the club. A month later however he returned to Mangotsfield, this time as manager with Steve Elliott appointed as his assistant.

Personal life 
Mehew had two sons who played in the youth academy of Bristol Rovers. Tom currently plays for Chippenham Town and Olly plays for Weston-super-Mare AFC.

References

1967 births
Living people
People from Camberley
English footballers
Association football midfielders
English Football League players
Leeds United F.C. players
Bristol Rovers F.C. players
Exeter City F.C. players
Walsall F.C. players
Northampton Town F.C. players
Yate Town F.C. players
Bath City F.C. players
Farnborough F.C. players
Rushden & Diamonds F.C. players
Forest Green Rovers F.C. players
Clevedon Town F.C. players
Paulton Rovers F.C. players
Brislington F.C. players
Weston-super-Mare A.F.C. players
Bitton A.F.C. players
Bristol Manor Farm F.C. players
Gloucester City A.F.C. players
English football managers
Gloucester City A.F.C. managers
Mangotsfield United F.C. managers
National League (English football) managers